The Temptress is a 1949 British drama film directed by Oswald Mitchell and starring Joan Maude, Arnold Bell and Don Stannard. It was made as a second feature at Bushey Studios. It was the final film directed by Mitchell before his death the same year.

Cast
 Joan Maude as Lady Clifford 
 Arnold Bell as Dr. Leroy  
 Don Stannard as Derek Clifford  
 Shirley Quentin as Nurse  
 John Stuart as Sir Charles Clifford  
 Ferdy Mayne as Julian  
 Conrad Phillips as Captain Green

References

Bibliography
 Chibnall, Steve & McFarlane, Brian. The British 'B' Film. Palgrave MacMillan, 2009.

External links

1949 films
British drama films
1949 drama films
Films directed by Oswald Mitchell
Films set in England
Bushey Studios films
British black-and-white films
1940s English-language films
1940s British films